Oxycanus buluwandji is a moth of the family Hepialidae. It is found in Queensland.

References

Moths described in 1964
Hepialidae
Endemic fauna of Australia